Saleh Abd al-Jawad (born 1952) is a Palestinian historian. Born in Al-Bireh, he received his PhD in political science from Paris X-Nanterre University in 1986 and works as Professor of History and Political Science at Birzeit University since 1981.

Publications 

 Abd al-Jawad, S., 2001, The Israeli Assassination Policy in the Aqsa Intifada, JMCC. 
 Abd al-Jawad, S., 2003, Le témoignage des Palestiniens entre l’historiographie israélienne et l’historiographie arabe : le cas de 1948 in COQUIO, C. L’histoire trouée. Négation et témoignage, Nantes : l’Atalante, pp. 627–639.
 Abd al-Jawad, S., 2005, Palestinians and the Historiography of the 1948 War, Muwatin.
 Abd al-Jawad, S., 2006 The Arab and Palestinian Narratives of the 1948 War in Rotberg, R.I., The Intertwined Narratives of Israel-Palestine: History's Double Helix, Indianapolis : Indiana University Press, pp. 72–113.
 Abd al-Jawad, S., 2007, Zionist Massacres: the Creation of the Palestinian Refugee Problem in the 1948 War, in Benvenisti, E., Gans, C. and Hanafi, S., Israel and the Palestinian Refugees, Berlin, Heidelberg, New-York : Springer, pp. 59–127.

References 

Living people
20th-century Palestinian historians
Historians of the Middle East
1952 births
Academic staff of Birzeit University
21st-century Palestinian historians